John F. Plumb (born 1970/1971) is an American aerospace engineer, politician, and United States Navy Reserve captain who is the assistant secretary of defense for space policy. He was previously the chief of government relations at The Aerospace Corporation. In 2016, he unsuccessfully ran as the Democratic Party candidate for the 23rd congressional district in New York.

Education 
Plumb was born in Jamestown, New York. He graduated from the University of Notre Dame in 1992 with a Bachelor of Science degree in physics. He later earned a Master of Science degree in physics and a PhD in aerospace engineering from the University of Colorado Boulder.

Career 
Plumb has served in both active and reserve duty as a submarine officer. After graduating, Plumb was commissioned in the United States Navy in 1993 and, in 2000, he moved to the United States Navy Reserve. He holds the rank of captain and serves as the commanding officer Commander, Submarine Force, U.S. Pacific Fleet Undersea Warfare Operations Headquarters.

Plumb has worked for more than 25 years at various positions in the White House, the Pentagon, and the United States Senate. From 2004 to 2009, he worked under Colorado Senator Ken Salazar first as a congressional science and technology fellow then as a legislative assistant. He worked for the United States Department of Defense from 2009 to 2013, working on nuclear, missile defense, and space policy. In 2013, he started working for the National Security Council as director of defense policy and strategy.

Plumb left the National Security Council in 2015 to run as the Democratic Party candidate for the 23rd congressional district in New York, challenging the Republican incumbent, Tom Reed. He lost to Reed by 42,466 votes.

After losing to the congressional election, Plumb then worked for RAND Corporation as a senior engineer. In August, 2020, he was hired by The Aerospace Corporation as the chief of government relations.

On July 29, 2021, Joe Biden nominated Plumb to serve as the first assistant secretary of the defense for space policy. He testified before the Senate Armed Services Committee on January 13, 2022, where he agreed that the space traffic management mission of the Space Force should be transferred to a civil agency. He was confirmed by voice vote on March 1, 2022.

References 

Living people
Year of birth missing (living people)
Politicians from Jamestown, New York
University of Notre Dame alumni
University of Colorado Boulder alumni
American aerospace engineers
New York (state) Democrats
Candidates in the 2016 United States elections
United States National Security Council staffers
United States Navy captains
United States Navy reservists
RAND Corporation people
United States Assistant Secretaries of Defense
Biden administration personnel